Mount Belanger is a  mountain, making it Alberta's 130th highest peak. It was named in 1921 by D.B. Dowling, in memory of Andre Belanger, a local mountain guide who drowned in the Athabasca River in 1814.  It lies within peaks that are between the Athabasca River and Whirlpool Rivers in Jasper National Park.

Climate

Based on the Köppen climate classification, Mount Belanger is located in a subarctic climate zone with cold, snowy winters, and mild summers. Winter temperatures can drop below -20 °C with wind chill factors below -30 °C.

See also

Geography of Alberta
Brussels Peak

References

External links
 Parks Canada web site: Jasper National Park
 Mount Belanger: weather forecast

Three-thousanders of Alberta
Mountains of Jasper National Park
Canadian Rockies
Alberta's Rockies